The Wellsville Mountains are located in northern Utah, United States and are often considered part of the Wasatch Mountains.

Description

The mountains separate Cache Valley from the Wasatch Front (Bear River Valley), as well as form a portion of the border between Box Elder and Cache counties. Nearly all of the water collected by the Wellsville Mountains drains into the Bear River.

While only moderately tall, they are particularly narrow. For this reason, it is often claimed they are one of the steepest mountain ranges in North America. Box Elder and the Wellsville Cone are its two highest peaks. US-89/US-91 traverses Box Elder Canyon, Dry Canyon, and Wellsville Canyon, beginning east of Brigham City as a four-lane highway, curving north then northeast and entering Cache Valley at Wellsville.

The mountains were named for the nearby City of Wellsville.

See also

 List of mountain ranges of Utah
 Wasatch-Cache National Forest

References

External links

 Photographs of the Wasatch Mountains

Mountain ranges of Utah
Mountain ranges of Cache County, Utah
Mountain ranges of Box Elder County, Utah
Wasatch-Cache National Forest
Wasatch Range